Kevin Mark Boothe (born July 5, 1983) is a former American football offensive lineman. He played college football at Cornell University. He was drafted in the sixth round (176th overall) by the Oakland Raiders in the 2006 NFL Draft. He also played for the New York Giants, winning two Super Bowls with the team, both against the New England Patriots.

Early life
Boothe attended Pine Crest School in Fort Lauderdale, Florida, where he graduated in 2001.

College career
Boothe attended Cornell University and was a three-time All-Ivy League selection and a member of Cornell's Quill and Dagger society.

Professional career
In the 2006 NFL Draft, he was selected by the Oakland Raiders in the sixth round with the 176th overall pick.

Oakland Raiders
Boothe was the first player drafted from Cornell since 1997. He finished the 2006 season as the starting right guard for the Oakland Raiders.

New York Giants
After being waived by the Raiders in the 2007 pre-season, Boothe was claimed by the New York Giants. He won Super Bowl XLII and XLVI with the Giants, both against Tom Brady and the New England Patriots, and he was the starting left guard in the latter game.

Set to become a free agent in 2013, Boothe re-signed with the Giants on a one-year contract on March 25, 2013.

Second stint with Raiders
After becoming a free agent after the 2013 season, Boothe signed a contract with his former team, the Oakland Raiders, on March 17, 2014. The contract was for two years worth $3.4 million.

References

External links

Oakland Raiders bio
New York Giants bio

1983 births
Living people
African-American players of American football
American football centers
American football offensive guards
American football offensive tackles
Cornell Big Red football players
Cornell University School of Hotel Administration alumni
New York Giants players
Oakland Raiders players
Sportspeople from Queens, New York
Players of American football from New York City
21st-century African-American sportspeople
20th-century African-American people
Pine Crest School alumni